The Western United States Pipe Band Association is an association of pipe bands from the Western United States. It sanctions band and solo piping competitions and has a membership of over fifty bands.

History
The association was founded in 1963 and was originally called the Pacific Coast Pipe Band Association. Later, it expanded geographically to include more of the Western United States, including bands in Arizona, California, New Mexico, Nevada, Colorado, Idaho, and Utah. It offers band, solo piping and drumming, and drum major competitions with accredited judges at WUSPBA-sanctioned events in several states, and it is a member of the Alliance of North American Pipe Band Associations. The association also maintains a list of instructors within the area of its jurisdiction. The organization includes over fifty bands, ranging from juvenile and grade 5 bands to grade 2 bands such as the Prince Charles Pipe Band and the Los Angeles Scots.

Branches
WUSPBA is made up of five branches and special interest groups:
 Desert Branch
 Arizona Emerald Society Pipes & Drums
 Glendale Pipes and Drums
 Las Vegas Pipe Band
 Mesa Caledonian Pipe Band
 Phoenix Pipe Band
 Southwest Skye Pipes and Drums
 Tucson & District Pipe Band
 Great Basin Branch
 Garden Valley Pipe Band
 Payson High School Pipe Band
 Red Sky Collective Pipes & Drums
 Salt Lake Scots
 Utah Pipe Band
 Wasatch & District Pipe Band
 Intermountain Branch
 Albuquerque and Four Corners Pipes and Drums
 Castlewood Lion Pipe Band
 Centennial State Pipes & Drums
 Ciorcal Cairde Irish Pipes and Drums
 Colorado Youth Pipe Band
 Denver & District Pipe Band
 High Desert Pipes & Drums
 Lander Volunteer Fire Department
 Michael Collins Pipes & Drums
 Northern Colorado Caledonia Pipe Band
 Pikes Peak Highlanders Pipes & Drums
 Queen City Pipe Band
 Northern Branch
 City of Sacramento Pipe Band
 Humboldt Highlanders Pipe Band
 Irish Pipers Band of San Francisco
 Jefferson Pipe Band
 MacIntosh Pipe Band
 Pipes and Drums of CAL FIRE Local 2881
 Prince Charles Pipe Band
 Silicon Valley Pipe Band
 Southern Branch
 Association of Orange County Deputy Sheriffs Pipe Band
 Cameron Highlanders Pipe Band
 Glendora High School Pipe Band
 House of Scotland Pipe Band
 Kevin R. Blandford Memorial Pipe Band
 Long Beach Pipe Band
 Los Angeles Police Emerald Society Pipes & Drums
 Los Angeles Scottish Pipe Band
 Pacific Coast Highlanders Pipe Band
 Pasadena Scots Pipes & Drums
 Pipes and Drums of Cal Fire Local 2881
 San Diego Law Enforcement Emerald Society Pipe Band
 Santa Clara County Sheriff's Office Pipe Band
 Seven Celtic
 University of California, Riverside Pipe Band

COVID-19
Throughout the COVID-19 pandemic, WUSPBA has remained active and continued to engage members through a variety of events and online workshops, despite most events being cancelled throughout the Western US during the 2020 and 2021 competition seasons.

See also
List of pipe band associations
Pipe band association

References

External links
 Official web site

Pipe band associations
Music organizations based in the United States